Angiometopa is a genus of true flies in the family Sarcophagidae.

Species
A. bajkalensis Kolomiets & Artamonov, 1981
A. falleni Pape, 1986
A. flavisquama Villeneuve, 1911
A. mihalyii Rohdendorf & Verves, 1978
A. ravinia Parker, 1916

References 

Sarcophagidae
Schizophora genera
Taxa named by Friedrich Moritz Brauer
Taxa named by Julius von Bergenstamm